Stonehaven is a Canadian rural community in Gloucester County, New Brunswick, in the parish of New Bandon.

Stonehaven is the site of a harbour.

Full medical services are provided by Chaleur Regional Hospital, part of the la Régie de la santé Acadie-Bathurst Health Authority located in Bathurst.

Fire protection is provided by the New Bandon - Salmon Beach volunteer fire department located in Janeville.

Air transport is available at Bathurst Airport (ZBF/CZBF).

History

The area was settled in the early nineteenth century by Irish, Scottish and English immigrants. To the east of Stonehaven are Grande Anse and Caraquet, which were settled by Acadians.

Industry in Stonehaven in the late nineteenth and early twentieth centuries included quarrying of sandstone for grindstones by the Read Stone Company, family farming, inshore fishing, and lobster canning. With the depletion of cod stocks, fishing is largely confined to lobster.

Notable people

See also

List of lighthouses in New Brunswick
List of communities in New Brunswick

References

External links
Fisheries and Oceans Canada (Select 'Stonehaven')
City of Bathurst
Bathurst
Brief account of the Read Stone Company
Patsy Hennessy's Digging Up Bones
Province of New Brunswick Archives (Search option)

Communities in Gloucester County, New Brunswick